Buffon  may refer to:
Georges-Louis Leclerc, Comte de Buffon (1707–1788), French naturalist
Gianluigi Buffon (born 1978), Italian football goalkeeper
Lorenzo Buffon (born 1929), former Italian football goalkeeper, cousin of the grandfather of Gianluigi Buffon
Buffon, Côte-d'Or, a town in the French département of Côte-d'Or
Buffon (crater), a lunar crater
Cape Buffon, a headland in South Australia

See also
 Bouffant
 Buffoon

Surnames of Italian origin